The 1987–88 Los Angeles Kings season, was the Kings' 21st season in the National Hockey League. It saw the Kings finish in fourth place in the Smythe Division with a record of 30 wins, 42 losses, and 8 ties for 68 points. The team finished last in the league in goaltending, with 359 goals allowed. They lost the Division Semi-finals in five games to the Calgary Flames.

This was the last season that the Kings wore purple and gold uniforms with a crown logo adorning the front. After this season, they would introduce a new logo with a white, black, and silver uniform, coinciding with the acquisition of Wayne Gretzky from the Edmonton Oilers.

Regular season

Final standings

Schedule and results

Playoffs

(S1) Calgary Flames vs. (S4) Los Angeles Kings

Player statistics

Defencemen
Note: GP = Games played; G = Goals; A = Assists; Pts = Points; PIM = Penalty minutes

Awards and records

 Luc Robitaille, Left Wing, NHL First All-Star Team

Transactions
The Kings were involved in the following transactions during the 1987–88 season.

Trades

Free agent signings

Free agents lost

Waivers

Draft picks
Los Angeles's draft picks at the 1987 NHL Entry Draft held at the Joe Louis Arena in Detroit, Michigan.

Farm teams

References

Los Angeles Kings seasons
Los
Los
Los Angeles
Los Angeles